Heatherton  (Bail’ a’ Fhraoich) is a small community in the Canadian province of Nova Scotia, located in Antigonish County. It has a Community centre, post office, Catholic church.  Local economy consists of farming, forestry and fishing.  Many people work in the town of Antigonish.  Also has a group home and a community centre with a bakery.

References

Further reading
Heatherton; Place-names and places of Nova Scotia

Communities in Antigonish County, Nova Scotia